Hwangju Byeon clan was one of the Korean clans. Their Bon-gwan was in Hwangju County, Hwanghae Province. According to the research in 2015, the number of Hwangju Byeon clan was 8037. He was from Longxi Commandery, China. After Song dynasty was collapsed, he was naturalized in Goryeo and was settled in Hwangju.

See also 
 Korean clan names of foreign origin

References

External links 
 

 
Korean clan names of Chinese origin